George Townsend (December 21, 1768 – August 17, 1844) was a U.S. Representative from New York.

Early life
Townsend was born on December 21, 1768 in Lattingtown, township of Oyster Bay in what was then the Province of New York, a part of British America.  He was the first son of Prior Townsend (1749–1803) and Sarah (née Feake) Townsend (1750–1833).  Among his siblings was Jacob Townsend, Hannah Townsend, Deborah Townsend and Hannah Townsend.

Career
Townsend engaged in agricultural pursuits.

Townsend was elected as a Democratic-Republican  to the Fourteenth and Fifteenth Congresses, serving from March 4, 1815 to March 3, 1819.

Personal life
Townsend was married to Deborah Cock (1776–1854), a daughter of Daniel Cock and Rosanna (née Townsend) Cock. Together, they were the parents of two boys:

 James Cock Townsend (1797–1882), a physician who married Anne S. Valentine, daughter of Hon. Richard Valentine. After Anne's death in 1836, he married Margaret Elizabeth Townsend (1809–1879), a daughter of William Townsend, in 1838.
 George Prior Townsend (1815–1854), who married Anna Frost in 1838, a daughter of Jervis Frost. After George's death, his widow married John W. Somarindyck.

He died in Lattingtown, township of Oyster Bay, New York, August 17, 1844.

Descendants
Through his son James, he was a grandfather of Julia M. Townsend (1842–1896), who married George Faile Valentine (1844–1891).

References

External links

1768 births
1844 deaths
People from Oyster Bay (town), New York
Democratic-Republican Party members of the United States House of Representatives from New York (state)